Annaly Capital Management, Inc. is one of the largest mortgage real estate investment trusts. It is organized in Maryland with its principal office in New York City.

The company borrows money, primarily via short term repurchase agreements, and reinvests the proceeds in asset-backed securities. As of December 31, 2019, 93% of the company's assets were mortgage-backed securities issued by either Fannie Mae or Freddie Mac. The company generates profits from the net interest spread between the interest earned from its assets and its borrowing costs, which is amplified from the use of leverage. As of December 31, 2019, the company had a debt-to-equity ratio of 7.2.

As of December 31, 2019, the weighted average days to maturity of its repurchase agreements was 65 days.

The company ranked 867th on the 2022 Fortune 1000 based on its 2021 revenues.

The name of the company came from the name of the area in Ireland that was ruled by the ancestors of the company's founder.

History
Annaly Capital Management was founded in 1997 by Michael A.J. Farrell and Wellington Denahan. Mike Farrell spent 26 years working for investment banks including E.F. Hutton & Co., Morgan Stanley, and Merrill Lynch.

In 2004, the company acquired Fixed Income Discount Advisory, an investment adviser, for $40.5 million in stock.

In 2012, Michael Farrell died after battling cancer.

In October 2012, co-founder Wellington Denahan became CEO.

In 2013, the company acquired CreXus Investment for $996 million.

Effective September 30, 2015, Kevin Keyes was named CEO of the company.

In 2016, the company acquired Hatteras Financial for $1.5 billion in cash and stock.

In 2017, the company sold its Pingora servicing subsidiary.

Effective March 2020, David L. Finkelstein was named Chief Executive Officer and a member of the Board.

References

External links

1997 establishments in Maryland
1997 initial public offerings
Publicly traded companies based in New York City
Companies listed on the New York Stock Exchange
Financial services companies established in 1997
Real estate companies established in 1997
Real estate investment trusts of the United States